Shadrack Lapologang Tlhaole is a South African politician and a party member of the Economic Freedom Fighters (EFF).

He is the provincial chairperson of the EFF and currently a Member of the Northern Cape Provincial Legislature for the party, after having taken office in November 2017. He formerly served as the provincial secretary of the party. Tlhaole was previously the provincial chair of the African National Congress Youth League (ANCYL). He left the ANC in 2016 and subsequently became a member of the EFF. Tlhaole became an MP for the EFF in February 2017 and served as one until his deployment to the legislature in October 2017. In November 2010, Tlhaole was named the Sunday Times' "Mampara of the week".

In October 2022, Tlhaole was elected provincial chairperson of the EFF. He succeeded former chairperson Aubrey Baartman as the party's leader in the legislature following Baartman's resignation.

References

External links
Shadrack Lapologang Tlhaole – People's Assembly

Living people
African National Congress politicians
Members of the Northern Cape Provincial Legislature
Members of the National Assembly of South Africa
Economic Freedom Fighters politicians
Year of birth missing (living people)